Pogorelovo is a rural locality (a village) in Kubenskoye Rural Settlement, Vologodsky District, Vologda Oblast, Russia. The population was 15 as of 2002.

Geography 
The distance to Vologda is 32 km, to Kubenskoye is 2 km.

References 

Rural localities in Vologodsky District